Bibiana Vaz de França (c. 1630 – 1694+) was a prominent nhara slave-trader in Cacheu, Guinea-Bissau.

Bibiana Vaz was a Lançada, or Luso-African born to a Kriston mother and Luso-African Cape Verdean father.

She married Ambrosia Gomez, who at the time was said to be the richest man in Guinea.

In 1687 Bibiana Vaz was arrested and taken to São Tiago (today as Santiago), where she was held as prisoner. Portuguese authorities, unable to her confiscate her property, granted her a pardon in exchange for an indemnity and a promise that she would construct a fort in Bolor on the Cacheu River. She never constructed the fort.

References

17th-century African businesspeople
African slave traders
African Christians
17th-century businesswomen
Women slave owners
Bissau-Guinean people of Portuguese descent